Whataupoko is the central suburb of the New Zealand city of Gisborne. It is located to the northeast of the city business district.

It is bordered by the city centre, and the suburbs of Kaiti and Mangapapa.

The name derives from the Maori terms 'Whata', meaning to elevate, support, bring into prominence or hang; and 'Upoko', meaning 'head'. This has often been considered to refer to the tribal display of the heads of defeated opponents but this is a mistaken attribution, based on ideas of the primacy and noble savagery of Māori that came from the assumptions of newcomers. Another theory put forward by residents is that 'Whata' and 'Upoko' mean the high head, or high point, or high chief, et cetera. Indeed, the point is the centre of the city, of the region, and at the centre of the suburb is still the seat of local government and oldest homes.

Tairawhiti Museum, Gisborne's regional museum established in 1883, is located in Whataupoko.

Demographics

Whataupoko had a population of 3,864 at the 2018 New Zealand census, an increase of 204 people (5.6%) since the 2013 census, and an increase of 156 people (4.2%) since the 2006 census. There were 1,485 households, comprising 1,857 males and 2,001 females, giving a sex ratio of 0.93 males per female, with 819 people (21.2%) aged under 15 years, 609 (15.8%) aged 15 to 29, 1,719 (44.5%) aged 30 to 64, and 714 (18.5%) aged 65 or older.

Ethnicities were 81.4% European/Pākehā, 28.0% Māori, 2.3% Pacific peoples, 4.0% Asian, and 1.6% other ethnicities. People may identify with more than one ethnicity.

The percentage of people born overseas was 16.4, compared with 27.1% nationally.

Although some people chose not to answer the census's question about religious affiliation, 53.2% had no religion, 35.2% were Christian, 1.1% had Māori religious beliefs, 0.5% were Hindu, 0.1% were Muslim, 0.5% were Buddhist and 1.9% had other religions.

Of those at least 15 years old, 696 (22.9%) people had a bachelor's or higher degree, and 438 (14.4%) people had no formal qualifications. 564 people (18.5%) earned over $70,000 compared to 17.2% nationally. The employment status of those at least 15 was that 1,548 (50.8%) people were employed full-time, 519 (17.0%) were part-time, and 78 (2.6%) were unemployed.

Parks

The Whataupoko Reserve includes a dog walking area, and walking and mountain biking tracks.

Waiteata Park has a picnic area and playground.

There are also several local parks in the area which allow dogs on leashes: Ballance Street Reserve, Fox Street Reserve, Grant Road Reserve, Hall Street Reserve and Sheehan Street Reserve.

Education

References

Suburbs of Gisborne, New Zealand